The Arabian sicklefin chimaera (Neoharriotta pumila) is a species of fish in the family Rhinochimaeridae found near Somalia, Yemen, and possibly India. Its natural habitat is open seas.

References

Neoharriotta
Fish described in 1996
Taxonomy articles created by Polbot